Institute of Engineering and Technology, Bhaddal is a private college located in Rupnagar, the newly created divisional headquarter of the state of Punjab, with academic and student facilities in an integrated technical campus. The institute was established in July 1998 by founder Er. Gurcharan Singh. The Institute  is a privately  good owned, accredited institution, approved by the University Grants Commission. IET BHADDAL CONTACT NUMBER https://ietbhaddal.edu.in/Contact

References

Engineering colleges in Punjab, India
Rupnagar
Private engineering colleges in India
1998 establishments in Punjab, India
Educational institutions established in 1998